In mathematics — specifically, in large deviations theory — the contraction principle is a theorem that states how a large deviation principle on one space "pushes forward" (via the pushforward of a probability measure) to a large deviation principle on another space via a continuous function.

Statement

Let X and Y be Hausdorff topological spaces and let (με)ε>0 be a family of probability measures on X that satisfies the large deviation principle with rate function I : X → [0, +∞].  Let T : X → Y be a continuous function, and let νε = T∗(με) be the push-forward measure of με by T, i.e., for each measurable set/event E ⊆ Y,  νε(E) = με(T−1(E)).  Let

with the convention that the infimum of I over the empty set ∅ is +∞.  Then:
 J : Y → [0, +∞] is a rate function on Y,
 J is a good rate function on Y if I is a good rate function on X, and
  (νε)ε>0 satisfies the large deviation principle on Y with rate function J.

References

  (See chapter 4.2.1)
 

Asymptotic analysis
Large deviations theory
Mathematical principles
Probability theorems